Udo Brecht (born 30 April 1943) is a German rower who represented West Germany.

At the 1967 European Rowing Championships in Vichy, Brecht won bronze with Hans-Johann Färber in the coxless pair. He competed at the 1968 Summer Olympics in Mexico City with the men's coxed four where they came twelfth. At the 1970 World Rowing Championships in St. Catharines, he won bronze in the coxless pair, this time partnered with Lutz Ulbricht.

References

1943 births
Living people
German male rowers
Olympic rowers of West Germany
Rowers at the 1968 Summer Olympics
People from Speyer
European Rowing Championships medalists
World Rowing Championships medalists for West Germany
Sportspeople from Rhineland-Palatinate